Government Center station is an intermodal transit hub in the Government Center district of Downtown Miami, Florida. It is operated by Miami-Dade Transit and serves as a transfer station for the Metrorail and Metromover rapid transit systems and as a bus station for Metrobus, Paratransit, and Broward County Transit buses. The station is located near the intersection of Northwest First Street and First Avenue, a part of the Stephen P. Clark Government Center Building. It opened to service May 20, 1984, next to the site of a former FEC railway station which is now MiamiCentral.

History

Metrorail and Metromover station

Development of the civic center was reinvigorated during the 1970s and early 1980s during a Downtown building boom. The boom spurred the development and construction the Stephen P. Clark Government Center, Metrorail, Metromover, and the Miami-Dade Cultural Plaza, which currently includes HistoryMiami and the Miami-Dade Public Library System Main Library.

Construction on the present-day Government Center station began in June 1982. The station was primarily designed by the Cambridge Seven Associates in collaboration with Edward D. Stone. The station was built by the Frank J. Rooney Construction Company. Metrorail service, between Overtown and Kendall, following the precise route of the FEC, commenced service May 1984.

An unused, partially completed ghost platform for a future East-West Metrorail line is adjacent to the west side of the mezzanine level below the current Metrorail station and is easily visible to passengers transferring from Metromover to Metrorail. This platform was part of the original design concept which interfaced with the atrium of the Miami-Dade County Administration Building, and the people mover station.

Florida East Coast Railroad station

Next to Government Center station is the former site of a railroad station developed in April 1896 as the southern terminus of Henry Flagler's Florida East Coast Railway (FEC). The downtown passenger terminal was demolished by November 1963. The FEC still owns the old station site, which was occupied by parking lots until 2014. It is now MiamiCentral, an intermodal transit hub. It has been served by Brightline higher-speed inter-city trains since 2018, and is planned to be served by Tri-Rail commuter trains starting in 2021.

Station layout

The second floor of the complex includes the main fare control for Metrorail and platforms for the Metromover loops, as well as the Metrofare Shops area. The third floor of the complex is a mezzanine for transfers between the two services. A ghost platform for a never-built east-west Metrorail line is located on this level. The fourth floor of the complex is the Metrorail platform. It is the highest transit platform of the Miami-Dade Transit system in height and can hold up to eight Metrorail cars.

Places of interest
Downtown Miami
Neighborhoods: Arts & Entertainment District, Park West, and Miami Jewelry District
Miami Art Museum
Historical Museum of Southern Florida
Miami Main Library
Stephen P. Clark Government Center
Miami-Dade County Courthouse
Museum Tower
Courthouse Center
U.S. Courthouse Building
Freedom Tower
The Congress Building
Downtown Omni Bus Terminal
American Airlines Arena
Bayside Marketplace
Flagler Street
Bayfront Park
Museum Park
Miami Art Museum
Adrienne Arsht Center for the Performing Arts
New World School of the Arts
Miami Dade College - Wolfson Campus
Olympia Theater
Miami Beach and South Beach (via lettered Metrobus routes)

Transit connections

Metrobus

BCT

Gallery

See also
Transportation in South Florida

References

External links

 MDT – Metrorail Stations
 MDT – Metromover Stations
 1st Street entrance from Google Maps Street View

Metromover stations
Metrorail (Miami-Dade County) stations in Miami
Railway stations in the United States opened in 1984
Bus stations in Florida
1984 establishments in Florida
Brickell Loop
Inner Loop
Omni Loop
Green Line (Metrorail)
Orange Line (Metrorail)